Kurt Sherlock is a dual international representing his home country of New Zealand in both rugby codes union and league, though he was never capped for a Test match under the union code. He made his rugby league début for the Kiwis in 1989.

Personal life

Sherlock has two sons and two daughters. He is an audit partner at Findex.

He attended Massey High School.

References

Sources

External links

1962 births
Dual-code rugby internationals
People educated at Massey High School
Living people
New Zealand international rugby union players
New Zealand national rugby league team players
New Zealand rugby league players
New Zealand rugby union players
Place of birth missing (living people)
Sydney Roosters players
Auckland rugby union players
Rugby league wingers
Rugby league centres
Rugby league five-eighths